Three-player mahjong is a variation of mahjong for three players rather than the more common four-player variations. It is not a mere adaption of four-player mahjong to suit only three players but has its own rules and idiosyncrasies that place it apart from the more standard variations. The equipment used and the basic mechanisms are much like four-player variations though some tiles are removed, certain plays are prohibited and the scoring system is simplified. The game is embraced in some Asian countries while ignored or snubbed in others.

Three-player mahjong is played mostly in Japan, Korea and Malaysia. This article focuses on rules from the earlier two (Japan/Korea) while other variations are covered in the following section. The rules given below are the most commonly used rules in Korean/Japanese three-player mahjong while optional house rules (extra rules which groups may opt to use) are listed afterwards. There are numerous possible house rules meaning three-player mahjong can be as simple or complex as players prefer.

Vanilla three-player rules

There are basic rules common among the three-player Mahjong variations played in Korea and Japan. The following presents the most commonly used rules with a list of variations afterwards. Those familiar with common versions of four-player mahjong will note the removal of several tiles (most notably most of the bamboo tiles), chows cannot be melded on a discard, discards are placed in front of the player, a player cannot win on a discard they have previously discarded themselves (sacred discard) and a notably different scoring system.

Tiles

Three-player mahjong is played with a standard mahjong set with several tiles removed. First, the north wind is removed. The 2-8 of bamboo is also removed. The four season tiles are also removed, but the four flowers are kept. There are no jokers or any other extra tiles.

Circles (dots) 1 to 9:

        

Characters 1 to 9:

        

Bamboo 1 and 9 (all four tiles of each; bamboo 2 to 8 are removed):

 

East, South and West (North is removed):

  

Red, Green and White Dragons:

  

The four flowers (there is only one tile of each):

   

The circles, characters, and bamboo are called simple tiles (they are numbered 1 to 9 and only tiles 1 and 9 are used in the bamboo suit). Of the dragons and winds (called honours), there are three kinds of each with no numerical value. Of both simples and honours, there are four matching tiles for each value (i.e. there are four red dragons and there are four 2 of circles).

Deal

Tiles are dealt just like other variations of mahjong except the walls are only thirteen or fourteen tiles long and only two dice are used. For those unfamiliar with stacking the wall, the following explains it for three-player mahjong.

Shuffling tiles
All tiles are placed face down on the table and are shuffled. By convention all players should participate in shuffling using both hands moving the tiles around the table rigorously and loudly for a lengthy period. Tiles may get flipped up during this process and players should flip them facing down as soon as possible to avoid identifying the location of the revealed tiles.

Stacking tiles

Each player then stacks a row of 13 or 14 tiles, two tiles high, in front of them (for a total of 26 or 28 tiles). East and West stack a row of 14 tiles, South and North stack a row of 13 tiles. One of the three players also stacks the North wall. Players then push each side of their stack together to form a square wall. Players may instead more informally build a triangle wall (18 tiles wide on each side – which also allows the use of three dice, if desired, for randomizing the wall cut).

Drawing tiles
The order of play is traditionally anticlockwise (counterclockwise) but some house rules may go the other direction.

The dealer throws two dice in the square wall and sums up the total. Counting anticlockwise so that the dealer's wall is 1, 5 or 9, South is 2, 6 or 10, etc. This determines which side of the wall will be cut and the tiles dealt from.

Using the same total on the dice, the dealer counts each stack of tiles on that side of the wall from right to left, and cuts the wall to the left of the count. Starting from the left of the cut, the dealer draws four tiles for himself (two stacks of two tiles) so that the wall decreases in a clockwise direction. Players in anticlockwise order draw blocks of four tiles until all players have 12 tiles. Each player then draws one last tile to make a 13-tile hand.

Dealing may be done more informally (without using dice and the dealer randomly cutting the wall wherever they choose). In some house rules the dealer deals out all of the tiles.

Objective
Each player's hand consists of 13 tiles. In sequence, players pick up a tile from the wall and discard one until a player has a legal hand. The majority of legal hands consists of 4 melds of three tiles and one pair of identical tiles. Melds can also consist of four tiles under certain conditions and there are a few uncommon and very specific winning hands that have a unique composition that break all the rules. These game rules are commonly interrupted by specific plays which include stealing a player's discard, forming a kong, putting a flower tile to the side, and a few other special rules.

Composition of Hands

Hands consist of four melds and one matching pair of tiles.

Melds

Chow
A chow is a set which consists of three tiles in one suit (either circles or characters) in numerical sequence (i.e. 5-6-7 of characters or 2-3-4 of circles). It can only be made of circles or characters as the remaining bamboo suit allows for no consecutive numerical sequence anymore. Chows must contain three tiles; two- or four-tile chows are not permitted. Unlike in four-player mahjong, chows can only be formed through the deal and drawing from the wall (and not by another player's discard), with the usual exceptions for the final move of a win.

Pong
A pong is a set which consists of three identical pieces of any tile (except flowers, which are bonus tiles and are always set aside). Examples would be three red dragons or three 2 of circles.

Kong
A kong is a special type of pong which consists of all four pieces of any tile. See below for the procedures for declaring a kong. It is the only set that permits four tiles.

Eye

On top of the 4 melds (chows and/or pongs/kongs) a winning hand must also include an eye. The eye is a pair of tiles (two matching identical tiles) such as two green dragons or two 9 of bamboos. Any simple tile or honour tile can be used.

General play

All players start with 13 tiles. The dealer starts the game by drawing the next available tile from the wall (going clockwise around the wall) adding it to their hand. (Typically, this draw is performed during the initial deal to speed up game start.) If this draw does not complete a legal hand, the dealer then discards a tile.

All players must have only 13 tiles in their hand, not including flowers (which are set aside) and the 4th tile of any kong they might have (which is considered an extra tile). Any kong declared or flower set aside, is replaced by a tile from the wall.

After the dealer discards, the next player, in anticlockwise order, draws the next available tile from the wall and discards a tile. Play continues until a player forms a legal, 14-tile hand. Play may be interrupted for any of the following reasons:

Flowers
The moment a player draws a flower, they should announce so, place it face-up to the side, and draw a replacement tile from the wall.

Stealing a pong
If a player can use an opponent's discard to complete a pong, the player calls this out (before the next player in turn has a chance to draw from the wall). The player takes the discarded tile, reveals the two matching tiles, and places all three face up on the table in front of their hand. This forms an "exposed" or "stolen" pong. The player then discards a tile when ready. Play continues with the next player (anticlockwise to the player who stole the pong, possibly skipping a player) taking their turn and drawing a tile from the wall. Note: A previously discarded tile cannot be used to make a pong (nor for any other reason) after the next player draws a tile from the wall, meaning all discarded tiles beforehand are untouchable.

Stealing a kong
If a player can use an opponent's discard to complete a kong from a pong concealed in their hand, the player calls this out (before the next player in turn has a chance to draw from the wall). The player takes the discarded tile, reveals the three matching tiles, and places all four face up on the table in front of their hand (placing three in a row and one on top of the one in the middle). This forms an "exposed" or "stolen" kong. The player must then draw an extra tile from the end of the wall (to have a full hand after completing a kong). (Technically, this is shorthand for stealing a pong with two matching tiles from your hand, and then promoting an exposed pong to an exposed kong with the third matching tile from your hand.) Play continues same as stealing a pong.

Promoting an exposed pong to an exposed kong
At any point during a player's turn they may add a tile in their hand to an exposed pong (a pong which was formed by stealing another player's discarded tile). The player adds it to the pong (placing three in a row and one on top of the one in the middle) and draws a tile from the wall to compensate for the extra fourth tile of the kong. This forms an "exposed", "stolen" or "promoted" kong.

Revealing a concealed kong
During a player's turn they may choose to reveal a concealed kong (four matching tiles) if they want to claim a replacement tile for the fourth tile in the kong (while also revealing to the other players that all four tiles are taken). The player reveals the tiles by placing all four in a row with the end two face down and the middle two face up. This forms a "concealed" kong. The player must then draw an extra tile from the end of the wall (to have a full hand after completing a kong).

Robbing the kong
If a player declares a kong and another player needs that tile to make a chow and win the game, the player may declare so and "go mahjong" (win). This is called "robbing the kong" and does not occur often. Note that this is limited to chows in this variant.

Winning from a discard
A player lacking only one tile to form a legal hand (whether completing a chow, pong, eye, or special hand) may steal the discard to win. The exception to this rule is the sacred discard (see below).

Sacred discard

Unlike many variations of mahjong, a player may not win from a discard if they, themselves, have discarded a matching tile previously. In order to keep track of discards, tiles are not thrown into the centre as in other versions of mahjong but are placed directly in front of their hand so that their discard history is easily seen. A player's discards are usually arranged in neat rows of six to ten tiles (depending on table preferences).

Irregularities

Changes
No changes can be made to a pong or kong which has already been declared (it cannot be taken back to form anything else).

Stealing chows
Stealing chows is allowed in some versions of mahjong but not in this version (or in Korean mahjong). You cannot meld a chow from another player's discard.

Stealing kongs
A discard cannot be stolen to add the fourth tile to a pong which has already been declared (stolen and revealed to the other players). This can only be formed by players taking the 4th tile from the wall on their turn.

Priority of stealing tiles
If two players both need a discard to win (or from robbing the kong, which would be unspeakably rare) then the player who can form the hand with the most hand-points takes it and wins. If both players have the same hand-points, then the player with the most bonus-points takes it and wins. If this is also equal, then the first player anticlockwise to the player who discarded takes it and wins. Winning always takes precedence over forming a pong or kong. (Note that it is not possible for two players want to steal the same tile at the same time to form a pong or kong.)

Mistakes
If it is noted that a player has too many or too few tiles in their hand (not including flowers or the 4th tile of a kong), robs a tile but cannot form the right set, forgets to put aside a flower, or has any other irregularity, they are usually heavily punished. Punishment depends on the house rules of each group of players. Serious flaws like having too many tiles (long hand or "big husband") typically involve having points deducted. Claiming to win mahjong while not having a legal hand should be seriously punished. Knocking over another player's tile should be punished. Calling out the wrong name of a tile (while discarding) may be one of the worst offenses possible – especially, if another player reveals that they could have stolen it had it been correctly named.

Hands, rounds, and matches

At the end of each hand, the dealership passes to the player to the right (anticlockwise). The dealer is always known as the East player, the player to the right as South, and the third player as West. In other words, your seat direction rotates as the dealer seat rotates.

Three hands make up a round. Thus, in each round, each player is dealer once. Each round is also named after its prevailing wind (East, South and West).

Three rounds make up a match. Thus, the entire match is 9 hands in total (3 hands in the East round + 3 hands in the South round + 3 hands in the West round).

Whether the dealer wins or not, or if there is a winner or not, dealership changes each hand.

Unlike other versions of mahjong, being East (or not) does not give any special bonuses (or penalties).

If a hand ends in a draw (goulash hand), however, the winner of the next hand first receives the usual points from his opponents and then an extra 5 points from each opponent. If, instead, there is a second draw (two goulash hands in a row), the winner of the next round receives 10 points from each opponent in addition to their usual points.  And so forth.

Players may choose to continue playing a second match after the first one ends (accumulating the points into a double match) or even a triple match (meaning a total of 27 hands).

Minimum hand-points
Only the winner's hand is scored (the other players' hands take no points). Points are counted based on the individual sets a player has, if they are made of simples or honours (e.g. circles or dragons), if these sets match the players seat (wind tiles), how the hand is composed as a whole (e.g. only one suit or all pongs and an eye), and special patterns. Bonus-points are then scored for having kongs, flowers and other criteria mentioned later. When being introduced to a game, the mechanics may be so overwhelming that no points may be scored and players simply try to win with any legal hand (0 points) until the mechanics of the game are understood. Once this is achieved, the player should be introduced to the minimum point chart and should be encouraged to form hands of at least three minimum points (passed on sets and/or overall composition of hand and/or special patterns). The scoring chart below gives all possible points. Experienced players will play for a higher minimum.

Melds and point settlement
Even if a player has a legal winning hand, most house rules requires that a player has a minimum number of hand-points first. Typically they are three points for novice play, six points for intermediate play, and 7+ points for advanced play. Bonus-points are included in the winner's final score but do not count towards the minimum hand-points a player needs to go mahjong (that is a player must have a minimum of hand-points and not a minimum of hand-points plus bonus points).

Discarder pays
If a player wins by stealing a discard, the player who discards has to pay the winner double the winners hand-points (the other player pays nothing). Both players pay the winner bonus points.

If a player wins from the wall, both players pay the winner hand-points plus bonus points.

Declare ready
A player with a concealed hand may declare ready. They can only do so if they are waiting for a single tile to complete a legal hand. The player puts his/her tiles face down and on their turn will take a tile from the wall and must discard it if it doesn't complete a legal-hand. The player gains points if they win though they become completely unable to change their hand.

Points
The point system is straight forward though may require some time to memorize the various elements. There are two classes of points which are hand-points and bonus points. There is a special class called limit hands which is treated later. In order to win a player needs to have a legal hand which scores the minimum or higher hand-points that players agree on before play (3 hand-points, 6 hand-points, 7 hand-points, etc.)

Unlike many other mahjong variations, only the winner scores and the other players take no points regardless of the content of their hands. Once a player wins he/she adds up all of his/her hand-points. If they meet the minimum hand-points they receive that number of points from the other two players. If they won from a discard then the person who discarded that tile pays for both players (the discarder pays double and the other player pays nothing). The winner then counts his/her bonus points and collects them from both players (even if the game was won on a discard). If a player was waiting for one tile to win, they pay two bonus points less.

Limit hand

If a player wins on a limit hand, the player scores either the agreed limit (usually 40 points) or a half limit (usually 20 points) and there is no need to total the other points. Limit hands can make or break a match.

Hand-points
A winning hand must have the minimum number of hand-points agreed on before the match starts. Points are based on specific melds (i.e. chows, pongs) a combination of melds (i.e. two matching pongs, three concealed pongs) or the entire hand (pure hand, seven pairs). Some melds/hands can score more than once (a kong of green dragons score 1 point for being green dragons and another point for being a kong).

Hand-points based on melds
 1 point any Dragon Pong
 1 point extra for having two dragons (three points in total)
 1 point any Wind Pong
 1 point more if the wind is players seat wind (two points in total for relevant winds)
 1 point More if the wind pong is the prevailing wind or round wind (two points in total for relevant winds)
 1 point every Kong
 3 points extra for 3 kongs (6 points in total)
 1 point Pong of 1 or 9 bamboo
 4 points extra for having both 1 and 9 bamboo (6 points in total)

Hand-points based on two or three melds
 2 points for having two identical chows
 3 points for having 3 concealed pongs/kongs

Hand-points based on the complete hand

 3 points for having all pongs/kongs and any pair
 6 points extra if player has all terminals (1s and 9s) and honours
 3 points for having a clean hand (hand is made up only of circle tiles and honour tiles or is made of only character and honour tiles)
 3 points extra if the hand is pure without honours (the hand consists purely of circle tiles or purely of character tiles)
 3 points for having 7 pairs (special hand consisting of seven different pairs)
 3 points for having three chows of 1 to 9 in circles or 1 to 9 in characters
 1 point for having all simples (no honours)
 2 points extra for having all chows and a pair of simples (three points in total)

Hand-points based on revealed/concealed hand

 2 points for having a concealed hand (player did not take an opponent's discard before going mahjong)
 2 points extra if the concealed is completed by a tile from the wall (four hand-points in total)

Bonus-points
The winner adds his/her hand-points to all the following bonus points which may apply (which is accumulative).
(Both opponents pay)
 2 points for winning from each player who was not waiting to win. Waiting means waiting for one tile from the wall or a discard that would give a legal hand meeting the minimum required hand-points. Sometimes a player may be able to win with one of two different tiles (exceptionally rarely for three different tiles). A player is not considered "waiting" if the tile they are waiting for has already been discarded (leaving no possibility of receiving that tile).
 1 point if player wins by a tile from the wall
 1 point if the tile was the last tile from the wall
 1 point if the winning tile was used to replace a flower or kong
 1 point if the winning tile was stolen by another player making a kong
 1 point for every extra tile player has that matches the tile the player used to win
 1 point for every flower player has (the number on the flower is not important like other variations)
 4 points extra if player has all 4 flowers 
 2 points if player has a concealed hand (player scores both hand-points and bonus-points)
 2 points extra if player has a completely concealed hand (won from the wall and not a discard)
 2 points if player declared ready
 2 points extra if a player declared ready and won from the wall

Optional rules and optional scoring
Playing with all the points above and all possible variations is impracticable and complicated. Players chose which points they want to use and will periodically change or add some as long as there is a full consensus. The following variations can be regional. All variations can be incorporated into the basic game.

Experienced players will raise the minimum hand-points needed to four points or more (each time becoming exponentially more challenging). There are a few limit hands. Limit hands are special hands that a player may have which score a set number of points. The amount is high and depends on whatever limit the players set. If playing for stakes, the limit may be low to avoid having to pay large amounts to each other. A couple patterns (13 orphans and heavenly gates), much like seven pairs, are special hands. They are the only three hands a player can have which do not fit the pattern of four melds and an eye (pongs/chows and a pair). They must be concealed hands though may be won on a discard or from the wall. They are optional and players do not need to include them in their game if not desired. A limit hand may effectively end a match if not playing for stakes as players may not be motivated to continue as beating a player who has won a limit has is incredibly difficult as winning limit hands (full limits especially) are exceedingly rare.

Only the winner of each game scores points for his/her hand (other players do not score any points but pay points to the winner). The winner will collect his/her total points from each player if he/she wins from the wall (unless a player was declared ready [see below]). If the winner wins on the discard of a player, that player pays the winner and the bonus points for the other player (the other player pays the winner only the hand-points). There are no doubles nor fan systems as in continental versions of mahjong. Points are never doubled for any reason. In the case of a player winning a half limit or limit hand, both players pay the winner (regardless of if there was a discard or not) either the limit or half of the limit (the limit depends on the players though it should be at least 40 points) and if he/she wins on a discard, the player who discards pays double.

Players may place a limit on how many points may be awarded for consecutive goulash hands.

Players in Western countries (in casual play only) may shift the winds from E, S, W to N, E S (removing the West wind instead of the North wind and having the dealer as North) to align with Western culture centering their compass on the North.

Limit hands
Hands are optional and players may use all hands or choose based on consensus which ones to use. As all are difficult and the limit hands being very rare, all hands are included by most experienced players.

Half limit
 Two dragons and a pair of the other dragon (little dragons)
 Two winds and a pair of the other winds (little winds)
 All bamboo and honours
 At least one terminal in all sets and honours
 Pure hand with pong of seat dragon or wind (concealed)
 Four concealed pongs
 Three kongs and a pair of honours
 Little Jade Dragon (pair of five bamboo with the green dragon)
 Three concealed Kongs
 Four Kongs (concealed or not)

Full limit
 All honours and or Terminals
 Great Dragons (all three dragons)
 Great Winds (all three winds)
 Pong of 1 and 9 bamboo and pair of five bamboo
 Four concealed kongs
 Thirteen orphans (1 and 9 of each suit, one of each dragon, one of each wind and a pong of any one of these elements)
 Nine gates is a concealed hand of 1112345678999 tiles in one suit, and winning on any extra tile of the same suit
 Pearl Dragon (all circles and a pong/kong of the white dragon, note pair must also be circles)
 Ruby Dragon (all character tiles and a pong/kong of the red dragon, note pair must also be characters)
 Great Jade Dragon (pong of 1 and 9 bamboo with the green dragon)

Dead wall
Thirteen tiles are not used in the game and are placed to the side. The dealer turns over one piece. The next tile in sequence is considered a dora (having any of those pieces in a hand will give a bonus point). For example, if the tile turned over is a 3 circle, then all 4 circles will be considered dora and having a pong of 4 circles will score 3 bonus points. If a 9 is turned over then the 1 circle is considered a dora. The sequence of dragons is green, red, white, green (i.e. if a red dragon is turned over, the white dragons are dora tiles). The sequence of winds is north, east, south, north. If a flower tile is turned over then all flower tiles score two bonus points in total and having all three (as the flower turned over is considered a part of the dead wall and not used during the game) then the usual eight bonus points in total are given.

North Wind as normal piece
The North wind is kept in play but can only be used as a pair (scoring two points) or as a kong (scoring six points). A player cannot call mahjong if they have only a pong of the North. Winning a hand by drawing or stealing a North win scores two extra bonus points. The North wind is considered an honour tile but there is no round of North nor a North prevailing wind or a North seat position. North Wind is not part of the three little or three big winds limit hand but is part of the 13 orphans limit hand as well as the all-honours hand.

All bamboos removed
All bamboo tiles are removed

Three declared ready
If all three players declare ready, depending on the variation, either that particular game is considered a draw, or the winner only wins his hand-points from the other players.

Dora Tiles
There are two forms of dora which may optionally be used in three-player mahjong.

Red Dora Tiles
In some Japanese mahjong sets, one five circles tile is coloured red and one five characters tile is coloured red (the other matching three of each tile is the normal colour). There are thus only two of these tiles. A player who has one red dora tile in their hand scores one bonus point, and if they have both red dora tiles they score six bonus points (in total). These dora tiles count as bonus points and do not count as hand-points nor towards the minimum hand-points needed to go mahjong.

Revealed Dora Tiles
The second form of dora which is distinct from the first, is the revealing of one tile from the wall before the game begins. If a simple tile is revealed, then the next tile in order becomes a dora tile (i.e. if the 5 circles is revealed, then all 6 circles become dora...or if the 2 character tiles are revealed, then the 3 characters become dora).
If a nine is revealed then the 1 of the same suit becomes dora. If a 1 bamboo is revealed then a 9 bamboo becomes dora. If a wind is revealed then the next wind in compass order becomes dora. If a dragon is revealed then the next dragon in alphabetical order becomes dora: Green-Red-White-Green.

A player scores one bonus point for each of these dora tiles used in the winning hand. The player scores one extra point if the player forms the eye using these tiles, two extra points if the player forms a pong, and scores six extra points if the player forms a kong using these tiles.

The red dora tiles are considered distinct from the revealed dora tiles and they should not be confused with each other. Table rules might include the red dora tiles but not the revealed dora tiles or the reverse. If table rules include both dora tiles, care should be taken not to mix the points scored for having them in their winning hand but to do so separately.

Dummy hand

The last thirteen tiles of the wall are not used in the game (considered an invisible fourth player).

Variations from specific regions

Honshū and other parts of Japan

Popular in the western part of Honshū, three-player Japanese mahjong incorporates a few changes which make it more suited to three players and simplified from four-player mahjong. There is no ghost player. Players need a minimum of one yaku to win. Refer to the article on Japanese Mahjong for unique Japanese playing concepts such as dora and furiten.

Tiles 2 through 8 are removed from the character suit. Chows cannot be melded. All four winds are used. Flowers are optional and not normally used. A dora tile is revealed at the beginning of the round, with more dora (such as uradora, kandora, and red fives) used or revealed later on as popular additions. The North wind also acts as a dora (Pei-dora) when it is exposed and set aside, or it may also be discarded as a safe tile (although an opponent may rob a concealed kong or a declared / discarded North tile to win with kokushi musou). Once all North wind tiles are exposed another dora tile is revealed in the dead wall, which consists of fourteen tiles as in four-player mahjong. A player cannot use a discard to win if his hand, prior to using the discard, does not contain a yaku (atozuke-nashi).

One-Han Yaku
 Yakuhai (A pung / kong of dragons, one's own wind, or the prevailing wind)
 Iipeikou (Two identical chows in one suit)
 Pinfu (A concealed hand consisting of four chows with a non-yakuhai pair and able to win with more than one possible tile)
 Riichi (Declaring ready; the hand cannot be modified (i.e., no concealed kongs))
 Tanyao (No honours or terminals)
 Haitei / Houtei (Winning with the last tile of the round)
 Rinshan kaihou (Winning with a kong or North replacement tile)
 Chankan (Robbing the kong)

Two-Han Yaku
 Chantaiyao (Honours or terminals in every set)
 Chiitoitsu (Seven different pairs)
 Daburu riichi (Declaring riichi on one's first turn)
 Ikki tsuukan (Tiles 1-9 in one suit)
 San'ankou (Three concealed pungs)
 Sankantsu (Three kongs)
 Iisou sanjun (Three identical chows in one suit)
 Toitoihou (All pungs)

3-Han Yaku
 Hon'iisou (One suit with honours)
 Junchantaiyao (Terminals in every set)
 Sanrenkou (Three sequential pungs in one suit)

4-Han Yaku
 Shousangen (Little three dragons)

5-Han Yaku
 Honroutou (Honours and terminals only)

6-Han Yaku
 Chin'iisou (One suit only)

Yakuman (Limit)
 Chiihou (Winning as a non-dealer with one's first drawn tile)
 Chinroutou (All terminals)
 Chuuren poutou (Nine gates)
 Daisangen (Big three dragons)
 Suushiihou (Big / little four winds)
 Kokushi musou (Thirteen orphans)
 Paarenchan (Winning after staying the dealer 8 times in a row with any legal hand)
 Ryuuiisou ("All green"; a hand consisting of only 2, 3, 4, 6, or 8 of bamboos and green dragons)
 Suukantsu (Four kongs; won immediately after the fourth kong is made, even without a pair)
 Suuankou (Four concealed pungs)
 Tsuuiisou (All honours)

Double Yakuman
 Kokushi musou, without having discarded any of the tiles previously nor having claimed a North wind tile as dora
 Suuankou, winning with a single tile to form a pair

Triple Yakuman
 Chuuren poutou, without having discarded any such tiles previously
 Tenhou (Winning as the dealer with one's first drawn tile)

Bonus Han
 Bazoro (2 bonus han for winning)
 Dora (including uradora, kandora, kan-uradora, Pei-dora, and / or akadora)
 Ippatsu (Winning within one round of declaring riichi, with no opponent pungs / kongs / Pei-dora in the interim)

Scoring, though simplified, is somewhat complex.

Malaysia
Malaysian 3-player mahjong is played with only circles and honours, as well as the extra eight flowers in a Malaysian mahjong set ("face" and "animal" tiles) and jokers ("fly" (飛) tiles), for a total of 84 tiles. There is no fixed game length and the dealer is the winner of the previous round.

A winning hand must be worth 5 fan, to a maximum of 10, earned thusly:

One face or animal / All four faces or animals: 1
Four flowers / Four seasons: 1
Own flower or season: 1
"Bamboo" flower or "Winter" season: 1
Pung of dragons / own wind / North / East: 1 (note: the prevailing wind is always East)
Little three dragons: 3
One suit with honors: 1
One suit only: 3
All chows with pair of circles: 1
All pungs / kongs: 2
Winning with kong / flower replacement tile: 1
Seven pairs: 1
Stealing kong: 1
Nine gates: 10 (note: must only be won by self-draw)
Big / little four winds: 10 (note: "pao" rule applies)
No flowers / seasons / faces / animals: 10
Four kongs: 10
Big three dragons: 10 (note: "pao" rule applies)
Winning with kong replacement tile after two consecutive kongs: 10
Four concealed pungs / kongs: 10 (note: must only be won by self-draw)
Four fly: 10 (note: this only applies to one's starting hand, or else the player must win after drawing four fly tiles later)
Winning with one's first or last tile: 10
All honors: 10 (note: "pao" rule applies)
All flowers / seasons / faces / animals: 10

Winning the hand earns 100 points, with 20 additional points for every fan. Both players pay the winner double this value if the hand is won by self-draw but if by discard only the discarder does so (the other pays the normal value). Kongs immediately score from the other players 100 points if concealed and 50 if open / promoted (open kong points are paid by the discarder for both players). A full set of bonus tiles in one's starting hand also earns an immediate 100 points, or 50 if drawn later. If the winning player does not score 10 fan the non-winner whose hand would have less than 5 fan (going by the first 5 fan in the list above) pays the other non-winner the score of the more valuable hand; if both non-winners' hands are worth more than 5 fan they only pay the difference. Fly tiles earn 50 points as a final bonus score for all players.

Recap
The following is an overview of set up, game play and scoring. Experienced players should be able to understand the game based on the following and using the scoring table further below. Each element however is detailed in the following sections.

The North wind is removed. Walls are formed as walls of 13 for dealer and the wall without a seated player and 12 for opponents, or in informal play, dealer with a wall of 19 and opponents with walls of 18 having no fourth wall. Each round includes three matches of three hands and there is no North round. Chows cannot be melded by discards, only pongs and kongs. Seasons are not used. 2-8 of bamboo is removed from the game with the option of using two 5 bamboo pieces which can only be used as a pair (which when successful scores many points). Sacred discard is in effect (you cannot win on a discarded tile if you have discarded it yourself earlier that hand). Discards are placed in front of players in rows of 6. There is not doubling and dealer passes to next player in all cases. In the case of a goulash game (no winner) the next winner takes one point from each player extra. Limit hands are optional and the limit starts at 40 points. Half limit hands in such a case being 20. Limit hands must be concealed. There is a distinction between hand-points and bonus points. A minimum of 3 hand-points is necessary to win (with experienced player playing with 4 and advanced players 5 minimum hand-points or more). Only winner scores, taking his total score (hand-points and bonus points) from each player with no doubling of any kind. Discarder pays the other player's score and only the bonus points if the player was ready to win (waiting for one piece with a legal minimum hand-points hand to be acquired). Seat dragons match seat winds (east is green, south is red and west is white). Seasons are omitted. Flowers score one bonus point each regardless of which numbered flower it is.

Changes in dynamics
The game dynamics in three-player mahjong, regardless of the rule set vary based on speed, the use of tiles, point keeps, using ghost players or not and how the lack of a fourth seat wind is dealt with.

Speed
The game is always faster. With one less hand and more tiles available to the other players, the game is speedy.

Wall
The wall remains the same, though playing with dead walls depends on the variation and the players. In very casual play the wall can consist of three sides.

Pieces
In some variations an entire suit is removed. In Malaysian mahjong only the circles and honours are used. In Korean mahjong one suit is removed or in other variations as well as in Japan, numbers 2-8 is removed from one suit. This radically changes the dynamics making certain hands more common such as single suited hands and hands without chows.

East
In many versions east scores or pays double (a little more complicated in Japanese scoring), however in Korean scoring and Korean/Japanese scoring, there is no doubling of any kind.

Ghost player
In some versions there is a ghost player, meaning 13 tiles are not used in the wall to mimic the lack of tiles in 4 player versions. This player also takes one of the four winds, (though no tiles are dealt out to any ghost player nor are points given). In Korean, Japanese and Korean/Japanese mahjong, there is no ghost player and all tiles are used during the games.

Dragons
In some variations, each player has a seat dragon as well as a seat wind which changes the point structure. There is however never a prevailing dragon even if there is a prevailing wind. When there is a seat dragon, East is green, South is red and West is white (fortunately it follows in alphabetical order in English from dealer to last player).

Melded (or declared) chows
In some variations these are not allowed. Only pongs and kongs in three-player games can be melded (or declared) meaning a chow can only be formed by a discard on winning.

In Korean mahjong, three-player Japanese mahjong and in Korean/Japanese mahjong, melded chows are never allowed except if done to complete a hand.

Social nature
It is far more social and less likely to be played for stakes as it is looked down on as a less serious version of mahjong. However, in some versions such as Korean/Japanese three player, the rules can be intricate or complex and playing for small or large stakes forces the players to try to make more complex hands.

Point systems
The point system may or may not change depending on the variation of mahjong. In some variations a higher minimum point is expected or less points are given for certain hands. Table rules are common in three-player versions and a comprehensive list of variations or versions would be a massive undertaking not in the known works in any. In Hong Kong Mahjong, the doubling system is used in which certain points pay off a certain amount of money which doubles each subsequent level. For instance 1 or 2 points pay nothing. 3 or 4 points pay one unit, 5 or 6 points pay two units, 7 to 10 points pay 4 units and anything more pays 8 units. The Japanese system is rather complicated, though is simplified in the three-player version. The Korean system and Korean/Japanese system is a simple 'pay a unit per point' to the winner. country.

Rule agreement
The best rule set to use is the one you are familiar with, adapting them to three players as you are comfortable. Korean/Japanese mahjong has a comprehensive set of rules well attuned for three-player gaming, for those with some experience in mahjong. The Malaysian version is a very simplified way for social playing. House rules of are the essence and players will decide their own rules over time.

History
Three-player mahjong is probably as old as mahjong itself, though it is speculated that mahjong originated as a game for only two players.
Korean/Japanese three-player mahjong, played in east Asia is an amalgamation of Old Korean mahjong rules (which traditionally omitted the bamboo suit and did not allow melded chows and had a very simple scoring system) with some elements of Japanese rules including sacred discard (a player cannot rob a piece to win if he discarded it before) and many bonus points. Korean mahjong in the past included many elements of both traditional Chinese mahjong and the Japanese scoring system. The rules have changed and there are no standard rules, though this variation shown here reflects the old rules though adapted for modern three player play (as Koreans include some or all bamboo pieces now). An experienced player should be able to read the recap at the bottom of this section and understand the rules well. Inexperienced players would need to read the following to understand the game.

Motivations
One of the motivations for playing with three players, is that finding a fourth may be difficult or that having one cancelling player (for a four-player game) ruins the possibility of playing at all and thus knowing how to play three-player mahjong means players can play, or always playing three-player mahjong limits the likelihood of someone cancelling. However, the dynamics of playing with three players is also a good motivation, especially when playing traditional Korean rules.

References

External links
 Mahjong.wikidot.com
 Sloperama.com
 Japanese-mahjong.com

Chinese games
Chinese words and phrases